The 1962 Marshall Thundering Herd football team was an American football team that represented Marshall University in the Mid-American Conference (MAC) during the 1962 NCAA University Division football season. In its fourth season under head coach Charlie Snyder, the team compiled a 4–6 record (0–5 against conference opponents), finished in seventh place out of seven teams in the MAC, and was outscored by a total of 237 to 137. Robert Maxwell and Roger Jefferson were the team captains. The team played its home games at Fairfield Stadium in Huntington, West Virginia.

Schedule

References

Marshall
Marshall Thundering Herd football seasons
Marshall Thundering Herd football